Hunt's is the name of a brand of preserved tomato products owned by Conagra Brands. The company was founded in 1888, in Sebastopol, California, as the Hunt Bros. Fruit Packing Co., by Joseph and William Hunt. The brothers relocated to nearby Santa Rosa in 1890, and then to Hayward in 1895. This small canning operation grew rapidly, focused on canning the products of California's booming fruit and vegetable industries.  By 1941, the plant shipped a hundred million cans of soup, fruits, vegetables, and juices annually.

In 1943, Hunt's was taken over by Norton Simon's Val Vita Food Products - a competing firm founded in the early 1930s and based in Fullerton, California.  The merged firm kept the Hunt's name and incorporated as Hunt Food and Industries, Inc.  The new management led by Norton Simon decided to focus the company on canned tomato products, particularly prepared tomato sauce.

The Wesson Oil & Snowdrift Company merged with Hunt's Foods, Inc. in 1960 to become Hunt-Wesson Foods. Hunt-Wesson merged with the McCall Corporation and Canada Dry to form Norton Simon Inc. in 1968.  Norton Simon was acquired by Esmark in 1983, which merged with Beatrice Foods the next year.  In 1985, Kohlberg Kravis Roberts acquired Beatrice with the goal of selling off businesses. Hunt-Wesson, the company which included the Hunt's brands, was sold in 1990 to agribusiness giant ConAgra Foods.   In 1999, ConAgra Grocery Products (the former Hunt-Wesson) moved from Fullerton to Irvine, California. The Irvine office was closed in 2006.

Besides several varieties of canned tomato sauce, the Hunt's brand appears on tomato paste, diced, whole, stewed, pureed and crushed tomatoes, organic and No Salt Added tomato products, spaghetti sauce, ketchup, barbecue sauce, canned potatoes, canned peaches and Hunt's Family Favorites line of canned recipe helpers. The Hunt's brand name also appears on Manwich brand sloppy joes products and formerly Hunt's Snack Pack Pudding. Reddi-wip whipped cream was originally also under the Hunt's banner.

In 1988, Hunt's catsup changed its label to ketchup.  In May 2010, Hunt's ketchup temporarily removed high fructose corn syrup from its ingredients. The new ingredients were "tomatoes, sugar, vinegar, salt and other seasonings". The product changed back to high fructose corn syrup in May 2012.

As of May 2017, the sugar-based version has been available for some time in the US, labeled as 100% Natural Tomato Ketchup and in the specific sizes; 20 oz, 28 oz, 38.5 oz, and 62 oz.

In December 2018, NFL quarterback Patrick Mahomes signed an endorsement deal with Hunt's. Mahomes is well-known for his love of ketchup, even putting it on unconventional items such as steak and macaroni and cheese.

See also
 H. J. Heinz Company

References

External links
Hunt's corporate website

1888 establishments in California
American companies established in 1888
Food and drink companies established in 1888
1943 mergers and acquisitions
1960 mergers and acquisitions
1968 mergers and acquisitions
1983 mergers and acquisitions
1984 mergers and acquisitions
1985 mergers and acquisitions
1990 mergers and acquisitions
Barbecue sauces
Ketchup
Conagra Brands brands
Brand name condiments
Companies based in Hayward, California
History of Hayward, California
Companies based in Santa Rosa, California
Food and drink in the San Francisco Bay Area
Food and drink companies based in California